This is a list of previous Green Party of Ontario candidates by election.

 Green Party of Ontario candidates in the 1990 Ontario provincial election
 Green Party of Ontario candidates in the 1995 Ontario provincial election
 Green Party of Ontario candidates in the 1999 Ontario provincial election
 Green Party of Ontario candidates in the 2003 Ontario provincial election
 Green Party of Ontario candidates in the 2007 Ontario provincial election
 Green Party of Ontario candidates in the 2011 Ontario provincial election
 Green Party of Ontario candidates in the 2014 Ontario provincial election
 Green Party of Ontario candidates in the 2018 Ontario provincial election

Green Party of Ontario